Midland Ward is a ward located under Nagaland's capital city, Kohima. The ward is sub-divided into three neighbourhoods: Upper Midland, Middle Midland and Lower Midland.

Attractions
Kohima War Cemetery

Kohima War Cemetery is a memorial dedicated to soldiers of the 2nd British Division of the Allied Forces who died in the Second World War at Kohima in April 1944. There are 1,420 Commonwealth burials of the Second World War at this cemetery.
Kohima Ao Baptist Church

The Kohima Ao Baptist Church is one of the biggest churches in Kohima.

Education
Educational Institutions in Midland Ward:

Schools 
 Mezhür Higher Secondary School
 Government Middle School

See also
 Municipal Wards of Kohima

References

External links
 Map of Midland Ward

Kohima
Wards of Kohima